"Young Hearts" is a song written by Roger Hart-Wells and David Crosbie and recorded by Australian band Little Heroes. The song was released in July 1982 as the second single from the band's second studio album, Play by Numbers (1982). The single peaked on the Australian Kent Music Report at #42.

Track listings
7" Single (EMI-765)
Side A "Young Hearts" - 3:20
Side B "Please Don't Wear That Hat" - 3:15

Charts

References

1982 singles
1982 songs
EMI Records singles